Samuel John Sackett (January 23, 1928 – March 2018), alternately Sam Sackett or S.J. Sackett, was an American professor of English and writer.

Early life and education
Sackett was born in Redlands, California in 1928 and graduated from Redlands High School in 1945. He received his A.B. from the University of Redlands in 1948 and his A.M. from the same institution in 1949. He subsequently attended the University of California, Los Angeles, receiving his Ph.D in English in 1956. At UCLA, he specialized in English literature of the Neoclassical period and in the history of literary criticism; his dissertation was titled, The Place of Literary Theory in Henry Fielding's Art.

Career
From 1949-1951, Sackett taught English and journalism at Hastings College in Nebraska. He then took a hiatus from teaching to earn his Ph.D at UCLA, after which he served as a professor of English at Fort Hays State University, for 23 years. During his tenure at Fort Hays State, Sackett published a translation of a Flemish novel, a collection of Kansas folklore and a critical study of E.W. Howe. He also wrote Cowboys and the Songs They Sang, a children's book that was  published in 1967. Additionally, Sackett founded and served as president of the Kansas Folklore Society and was co-editor with William E. Koch of Kansas State University of Kansas Folklore, as well as Book Review Editor of Western Folklore magazine. In the 1970s he was faculty advisor for the university literary publication: The Passionate Few. After leaving Fort Hays State, Sackett worked briefly as a freelance writer and newspaper reporter.

In 1980, he moved to Oklahoma and was hired as the Director of Creative Services for an advertising agency in Weatherford. It was there that he married his wife, Suwapee Sackett, a native of Thailand. After their marriage, Sackett joined a career management firm in Oklahoma City as a Senior Associate, next becoming Vice President of another Oklahoma City career management company and, finally, Vice President of the Oklahoma City office of Bernard Haldane Associates, where he remained for twelve years. While living in Oklahoma City Dr. Sackett also taught English and ESL classes at several universities.

In 2003, Sackett, retired to Ayutthaya, Thailand where he taught English and wrote short stories which were subsequently collected into two books, Through Farang Eyes and Snapshots of Thailand. Sackett's third volume of short stories, Chamberlain Stories, focuses on his time teaching in Kansas.

In 2009, Sackett and his wife returned to the United States to live in rural Canton, Oklahoma. Following their return, his first book, Sweet Betsy from Pike was published. Sackett had heard the song, Sweet Betsy from Pike, at an American Folklore Society meeting and, "it struck him that Betsy learned she couldn't trust sweet-talking Ike to take care of her and that she had the strength to take care of herself."

Ever since reading Howard Pyle's The Merry Adventures of Robin Hood in the fifth grade, Sackett had wondered about the truth behind the traditional legend. Answering that question resulted in his second book, The Robin Hood Chronicles, a different take on the story.

Adolf Hitler in Oz, Sackett's third novel, which he called "a children's book for adults," grew out of his, "belief that goodness and love, symbolized in the novel as the Land of Oz, will always overcome evil and hate, symbolized by Hitler." In addition, Sackett's interest in the psychological theories of Carl Rogers helped to shape the book.

Sackett also wrote a sequel to Mark Twain's Adventures of Huckleberry Finn, entitled Huckleberry Finn Grows Up. Twain was one of Sackett's favorite authors.

Bibliography

Books

 Rabbi Yeshua (2013)
 Huckleberry Finn Grows Up (2012)
 Adolf Hitler in Oz (2011)
 The Robin Hood Chronicles (2010)
 Sweet Betsy from Pike (2009)

Children's books

 Cowboys and the Songs They Sang (1967)

Short fiction

 Ali Cat in Oz (2018) [with Joe Bongiorno]
 The Wizard in New York (2018)
 The Horsemen (1953)

Short fiction collections

 Chamberlain Stories (2014)
 Snapshots of Thailand (2014)
 Through Farang Eyes (2014)

Articles

 Jesse James as Robin Hood (1980-1981)
 A New English Curriculum for the Small College (1979)
 Simile in Folksong (1963)
 Folk Speech in Schoenchen, Kansas (1960)
 The Utopia of Oz (1960)
 German Proverbs from around Fort Hays, Kansas (1959)

References

External links
 The Internet Speculative Fiction Database
 
 Author Spotlight no.385 - an interview with Sam Sackett

1928 births
2018 deaths
People from Redlands, California
University of Redlands alumni
University of California, Los Angeles alumni
Writers from California